Jacqueline Carol Jackson is a British writer who consults, counsels, speaks and writes on most autism issues. Her doctoral thesis, entitled 'Nurturing the Engagement of Children with an Autism Spectrum Disorder through Digital Polysensory Experiences', awarded from Coventry University, analysed the sensory differences of children with an ASD and the impact of the digital and built environment. Jackson is a single mother of eight children, three daughters and five sons, of whom all five sons and one daughter are on the autism spectrum. Jackson and her family appeared in a BBC documentary titled My Family and Autism in 2003.  A drama film called Magnificent 7 starring Helena Bonham Carter as Maggi, a character based on Jackson, aired on BBC Two in 2005. Jackson lives in Blackpool.

Children
Jackson's sons are:
 Matthew Richard – the oldest child in the family.  Matthew was born prematurely and is diagnosed with dyslexia and dyspraxia
 Luke Christopher – diagnosed with autism spectrum disorder and dyspraxia. Luke is also a writer of books on Asperger syndrome. As a teenager, he wrote two books on the subject; A User Guide to the GF/CF Diet for Autism, Asperger's Syndrome and AD/HD (2001) and Freaks, Geeks, and Asperger Syndrome: A User Guide to Adolescence (2002). In 2006, a grown Luke wrote a poetry book titled Crystalline Lifetime: Fragments of Asperger's Syndrome, and in 2016, he wrote a fourth book, a sequel to Freaks, Geeks and Asperger's Syndrome titled Sex, Drugs and Asperger's Syndrome (ASD): A User Guide to Adulthood
 Joseph David "Joe" – diagnosed with autism spectrum disorder and ADHD
 Ben Curtis – Ben was born prematurely, had a brain hemorrhage and is diagnosed with autism spectrum disorder
Izaac Noah – the youngest addition to the family; has a diagnosis of autism spectrum disorder and hypermobility

Jackson also has three daughters named Rachel Louise, Sarah Elizabeth and Anna Rebekah. Sarah has autistic spectrum disorder and Anna and Rachel display characteristics of ADHD but as yet, are not diagnosed.

Books
Multicoloured Mayhem, Jessica Kingsley Publishers, 2003, 
Damned Hard Day: Living with AD/HD, Jessica Kingsley Publishers, 2005,

References

External links
 
BBC on Magnificent 7

  (select "Previous" page of browse report; displayed under 'Jackson, Jacqui' without '1964–')

Alumni of Coventry University
Alumni of the Open University
Autism activists
Living people
People from Blackpool
Year of birth missing (living people)
21st-century English women writers
21st-century British non-fiction writers
21st-century English writers
English women non-fiction writers